Eduard Anatolievič Lobaŭ (1 December 1988 – 26 January 2023) was a Belarusian pro-democracy activist associated with the Young Front. He was imprisoned by the government of Belarus for his protest activities. Amnesty International considered him a prisoner of conscience.

Activism 
On 19 December 2010, following Belarus's disputed presidential election—in which pro-democracy opposition candidate Andrei Sannikov lost to Lukashenko, often called "Europe's last dictator"—a number of opposition protesters took to the streets.

In the week leading up to the protest, Lobau took an active role in organization. On 15 December, he was arrested and briefly detained along with two other Young Front activists for picketing Lukoshenko's office in Minsk with signs calling for his resignation. According to Amnesty International, the day before the protests, Lobau was reportedly assaulted by unknown attackers and immediately arrested by police, along with Zmitser Dashkevich, Young Front's leader. He was convicted of attacking his assailants and sentenced to four years in a labour colony in Ivatsevichy. On 31 August 2011, he refused to file a pardon application.

Imprisonment 
Lobau's imprisonment has been protested by human rights organizations including Amnesty International, which named he and Dashkevich prisoners of conscience and called for their immediate release. His case was also "adopted" by German Bundestag member Florian Toncar, deputy chairman of Germany's Free Democratic Party, who denounced his trial and imprisonment as "Stalinist". On 18 December 2014, Lobau was released from prison.

War in Ukraine 

Since the summer of 2015, Lobau has been fighting as a volunteer in the war in Donbas. He served in one of the Ukrainian units near Mariupol.

Death 
On 26 January 2023, Lobau was killed in action near Vuhledar, during the Russian invasion of Ukraine. He was 34.

References

1988 births
2023 deaths
People from Vilnius
Amnesty International prisoners of conscience held by Belarus
Belarusian democracy activists
Belarusian dissidents
Belarusian prisoners and detainees
Pro-Ukrainian people of the war in Donbas
Foreign volunteers in the 2022 Russian invasion of Ukraine
Ukrainian military personnel killed in the 2022 Russian invasion of Ukraine